Birds of Prey, also known in the United States as The Perfect Alibi, is a 1930 British mystery film produced and directed by Basil Dean, from a screenplay he co-wrote with A.A. Milne from Milne's play which was known as The Perfect Alibi in the United States and The Fourth Wall in the United Kingdom. The film stars Dorothy Boyd, Robert Loraine, Warwick Ward, C. Aubrey Smith, Frank Lawton, and Robert Loraine, and was produced at Beaconsfield Studios by Associated Talking Pictures.

Plot
At his country estate, Arthur Hilton (C. Aubrey Smith) is regaling his dinner guests with his exploits as a police officer decades earlier in Africa.  He keys in a case where he had to track down a gang of three men who were suspected of a series of murders.  He does stumble on them, but they actually end up capturing him.  Fortunately, he was able to talk his way out of that predicament, and later on tracked them down again and captured them.  One was hanged for his crimes, while the other two were sentenced to twenty years in prison.

Little does Hilton know that two of his dinner guests, Edward Laverick (Warwick Ward) and Edward Carter (Robert Loraine), are the two men he sent to prison.  They have vowed revenge, and prior to dinner, they exact it, killing Hilton.  However, they have planned it to look like a suicide on the part of the elderly aristocrat.  Initially, their plot seems successful, as the local constables who arrive to investigate the incident buy into the suicide scenario.

Hilton's nephew, Jimmy Hilton (Frank Lawton), and his girlfriend Mollie (Dorothy Boyd), who also happens to be the ward of the elder Hilton, become suspicious of the story told by the two men, and begin their own investigation. Their questioning leads them to arrive at the truth, and the two murderers are apprehended.

Cast
 Dorothy Boyd as Mollie Cunningham
 Nigel Bruce as Major Fothergill
 Audrey Carten as Jane
 David Hawthorne as Sergeant Joe Mallet
 Ellis Jeffreys as Elizabeth Green
 Robert Loraine as Edward Pontifex Carter
 Frank Lawton as Jimmy Hilton
 Tom Reynolds as Police Constable Mallet
 C. Aubrey Smith as Arthur Hilton
 Warwick Ward as Edward Laverick
 Jack Hawkins as Alfred

(Cast list as per AFI and BFI databases)

Reception
Mordaunt Hall of The New York Times gave the film a lukewarm review, praising several of the players, particularly Smith and Ward, while questioning the abilities of some of the other actors, such as Loraine.  He felt the direction was uneven, stating the overall production, "may not be endowed with imaginative direction, but, because of the author's intriguing story and C. Aubrey Smith's excellent performance, it succeeds in being an entertaining study of a cool, calculating murderer".

Notes
Rupert Downing also contributed to the screenplay.

The film's art direction was by Clifford Pember.

Jack Hawkins made his screen debut in this film.

The play on which this film is based was produced in London at the Haymarket Theatre in 1928. The play, under the title, The Perfect Alibi, was produced on Broadway at the Charles Hopkins Theatre on Broadway from November 1928 through July 1929.

References

Bibliography
 Low, Rachael. Filmmaking in 1930s Britain. George Allen & Unwin, 1985.
 Perry, George. Forever Ealing. Pavilion Books, 1994.
 Wood, Linda. British Films, 1927-1939. British Film Institute, 1986.

External links

1930 films
British mystery drama films
British crime drama films
1930s mystery drama films
1930 crime drama films
1930s English-language films
British films based on plays
Films based on works by A. A. Milne
Films directed by Basil Dean
Films set in England
Films shot in Buckinghamshire
Associated Talking Pictures
Films shot at Beaconsfield Studios
RKO Pictures films
American mystery drama films
American black-and-white films
British black-and-white films
1930s American films
1930s British films